Oshae Jones (born March 1, 1998) is an American welterweight boxer. She won the bronze medal in the women's  welterweight event at the 2020 Summer Olympics Oshae Jones' brother, Otha Jones III, is also a boxer.

References

1998 births
Living people
American women boxers
Boxers at the 2019 Pan American Games
Pan American Games gold medalists for the United States
Pan American Games medalists in boxing
Medalists at the 2019 Pan American Games
Medalists at the 2020 Summer Olympics
Olympic bronze medalists for the United States in boxing
Boxers at the 2020 Summer Olympics
Boxers from Ohio
Sportspeople from Toledo, Ohio
21st-century American women